Virola carinata is a New World, tropical evergreen tree in the family Myristicaceae that is indigenous to Colombia, Venezuela and Brazil (Amazonas and Rondônia). It grows to a height of about 30m and its fruit is subglobular, 16–20 mm long and 17–19 mm in diameter, found in groups of 4 to 12.

See also
Psychedelic plants

References

carinata
Medicinal plants
Plants described in 1897
Flora of Brazil
Flora of Colombia
Flora of Venezuela